This page lists notable table tennis events taking place in 2019.

World table tennis events
Senior
 April 21–28: 2019 World Table Tennis Championships in  Budapest
 Singles:  Ma Long (m) /  Liu Shiwen (f)
 Doubles:  (Ma Long & Wang Chuqin) (m) /  (Sun Yingsha & Wang Manyu) (f)
 Mixed:  (Xu Xin & Liu Shiwen)
 October 18–20: 2019 ITTF Women's World Cup in  Chengdu
 Winner:  Liu Shiwen
 November 6–10: 2019 ITTF Team World Cup in  Tokyo
 Men:  defeated , 3–1 in games played, to win their eighth consecutive and tenth overall Men's ITTF Team World Cup title.
 Both  and  took third place each.
 Women:  defeated , 3–0 in games played, to win their ninth consecutive and 11th overall Women's ITTF Team World Cup title.
 Both  and  took third place each.
 November 29 – December 1: 2019 ITTF Men's World Cup in  Chengdu

Junior and cadet
 October 23–31: 2019 ITTF World Cadet Challenge in  Władysławowo
 Singles:  Darius Movileanu (m) /  Kaho Akae (f)
 Men's doubles:  Sora Matsushima &  Navid Shams
 Women's doubles:  Kaho Akae &  LEE Yeon-hui
 Mixed:  Izaac Yong QUEK &  Elena Zaharia
 November 24 – December 1: 2019 World Junior Table Tennis Championships in  Korat

Continental table tennis championships

Africa (TT)
Senior
 August 3–5: 2019 ITTF African Cup in  Lagos
 Singles:  Omar Assar (m) /  Dina Meshref (f)
 August 20–29: 2019 African Games in  Rabat
 Singles:  Olajide Omotayo (m) /  Dina Meshref (f)
 Doubles:  (Sami Kherouf & Mohamed Sofiene Boudjadja) (m) /  (Offiong Edem & Cecilia Otuime Akpan) (f)
 Mixed:  (Omar Assar & Dina Meshref)

Junior and cadet
 April 7–13: 2019 African Youth, Junior and cadet Championships in  Accra

 Junior boys' singles:  Azeez Solanke
 Junior girls' singles:  Sara El-Hakem
 Junior boys' doubles:  (Jamiu Ayanwale & Azeez Solanke)
 Junior girls' doubles:  (Sara El-Hakem & Hend Fathy)
 Junior mixed doubles:  (Marwan Abdelwahab & Alaa Yehia)

 Cadet boys' singles:  Taiwo Mati
 Cadet girls' singles:  Hana Goda

Americas (TT)
Senior
 February 1–3: 2019 ITTF Pan-America Cup in  Guaynabo
 Singles:  Hugo Calderano (m) /  Adriana Díaz (f)
 August 4–10: 2019 Pan American Games in  Lima
 Singles:  Hugo Calderano (m) /  Adriana Díaz
 Doubles:  (Hugo Calderano & Gustavo Tsuboi) (m) /  (Adriana Díaz & Melanie Díaz) (f)
 Mixed doubles:  (Eugene Wang & Zhang Mo)
 Men's team:  (Nicholas Tio, Nikhil Kumar, & Kanak Jha)
 Women's team:  (Melanie Díaz, Daniely Ríos, & Adriana Díaz)
 September 3–8: 2019 Pan American Table Tennis Championships in  Asunción
 Singles:  Vitor Ishiy (m) /  Lily Zhang (f)
 Doubles:  (Gaston Alto & Horacio Cifuentes) (m) /  (Jennifer Wu & Lily Zhang) (f)
 Mixed doubles:  (ZHANG Kai & Lily Zhang)
 Men's team:  (Vitor Ishiy, Thiago Monteiro, Eric Jouti, & Gustavo Tsuboi)
 Women's team:  (Jennifer Wu, Lily Zhang, Crystal Wang, & Amy Wang)

Junior and cadet
 June 24–29: 2019 Pan American Junior Table Tennis Championships in  Cancún
 Note: This table tennis event ended prematurely, due to no venue(s) available to complete the tournament.
 Mixed:  (Nikhil Kumar & Amy Wang)

Asia (TT)
Senior
 April 5–7: 2019 ITTF-ATTU Asian Cup in  Yokohama
 Singles:  Fan Zhendong (m) /  Zhu Yuling (f)
 September 15–22: 2019 Asian Table Tennis Championships in  Yogyakarta
 Singles:  Xu Xin (m) /  Sun Yingsha (f)
 Doubles:  (Liang Jingkun & Lin Gaoyuan) (m) /  (Ding Ning & Zhu Yuling) (f)
 Mixed:  (Xu Xin & Liu Shiwen)

Junior and cadet
 September 2–7: 2019 Asian Junior and cadet Championships in  Ulaanbaatar

 Junior boys' singles:  XU Yingbin
 Junior girls' singles:  Miyu Nagasaki
 Junior boys' doubles:  (Yukiya Uda & Shunsuke Togami)
 Junior girls' doubles:  (Miyuu Kihara & Miyu Nagasaki)
 Junior mixed doubles:  (XU Yingbin & SHI Xunyao)

 Cadet boys' singles:  CHEN Yuanyu
 Cadet girls' singles:  CHEN Yi

Europe (TT)
Senior
 February 2 & 3: 2019 Europe Top 16 Cup in  Montreux
 Singles:  Dimitrij Ovtcharov (m) /  Petrissa Solja (f)
 June 22–29: 2019 European Games in  Minsk
 Singles:  Timo Boll (m) /  Fu Yu (f)
 Doubles:  (Patrick Franziska, Dimitrij Ovtcharov, & Timo Boll) (m) /  (Han Ying, Nina Mittelham, & Shan Xiaona) (f)
 Mixed:  (Patrick Franziska & Petrissa Solja)
 September 3–8: 2019 European Table Tennis Championships in  Nantes
 Men's team winners:  (Timo Boll, Ruwen Filus, Patrick Franziska, Dimitrij Ovtcharov, & Benedikt Duda)
 Women's team winners:  (Daniela Dodean, Elizabeta Samara, Bernadette Szőcs, Irina Ciobanu, & Adina Diaconu)

U-21, Junior and cadet
 March 7–10: 2019 European Under-21 Table Tennis Championships in  Gondomar
 Singles:  Ioannis Sgouropoulos (m) /  Adina Diaconu (f)
 Doubles:  (Darko Jorgic & Peter Hribar) (m) /  Tin-Tin Ho &  Karoline Mischek (f)
 July 7–16: 2019 Table Tennis European Youth Championships in  Ostrava
 Junior
 Singles:  Truls Moregard (m) /  Anna Węgrzyn (f)
 Doubles:  (Lev Katsman & Maksim Grebnev) (m) /  (Kristina Kazantseva & Mariia Tailakova) (f)
 Mixed:  (Samuel Kulczycki & Katarzyna Węgrzyn)
 Team:  (m) /  (f)
 Cadet
 Singles:  Darius Movileanu (m) /  Elena Zaharia (f)
 Doubles:  (Iulian Chiriță & Eduard Ionescu) (m) /  Prithika Pavade &  Elena Zaharia (f)
 Mixed:  (Thibault Poret & Prithika Pavade)
 Team:  (m) /  (f)
 October 4–6: 2019 European Youth Top 10 in  Noordwijk
 For results, click here.

Oceania (TT)
Senior
 May 25 & 26: 2019 ITTF-Oceania Cup in  Bora Bora
 Singles:  Hu Heming (m) /  Jian Fang Lay (f)

Junior and cadet
 August 7–10: 2019 ITTF-Oceania Junior Championships in  Nukuʻalofa

 Junior boys' singles:  Nathan Xu
 Junior girls' singles:  Parleen Kaur
 Junior boys' doubles:  (Nicholas Lum & Finn Luu)
 Junior girls' doubles:  (Matilda Alexandersson & Parleen Kaur)
 Junior mixed doubles:  (Finn Luu & Parleen Kaur)

 Cadet boys' singles:  Finn Luu
 Cadet girls' singles:  Chermaine Quah
 Cadet boys' doubles:  (Nicholas Lum & Finn Luu)
 Cadet girls' doubles:  (Constantina Psihogios & Chermaine Quah)
 Cadet mixed doubles:  (Isaiah Lee & Constantina Psihogios)

2019 ITTF World Veterans Tour
 Note: This tour made its debut this year.
 August 8–11: WVT 2019 - Shenzhen in 
 For results, click here.
 September 11–15: WVT 2019 - Townsville in 
 For results, click here.
 October 17–20: WVT 2019 - Fort Lauderdale in the 
 For results, click here.
 November 7–10: WVT 2019 - Doha in 
 For results, click here.

2019 ITTF World Tour
World Tour Platinum events
 March 26–31: 2019 Qatar Open in  Doha
 Singles:  Ma Long (m) /  Wang Manyu (f)
 Doubles:  (Ho Kwan Kit & Wong Chun Ting) (m) /  (SUN Yingsha & Wang Manyu) (f)
 Mixed:  (Xu Xin & Liu Shiwen)
 May 28 – June 2: 2019 China Open in  Shenzhen
 Singles:  Ma Long (m) /  Chen Meng (f)
 Doubles:  (Timo Boll & Patrick Franziska) (m) /  (Gu Yuting & Liu Shiwen) (f)
 Mixed:  (LIN Yun-ju & Cheng I-ching)
 June 12–16: 2019 Japan Open in  Sapporo
 Singles:  Xu Xin (m) /  SUN Yingsha (f)
 Doubles:  (Fan Zhendong & Xu Xin) (m) /  (Chen Meng & Liu Shiwen) (f)
 Mixed:  (Xu Xin & Zhu Yuling)
 July 9–14: 2019 Australian Open in  Geelong
 Singles:  Xu Xin (m) /  SUN Yingsha (f)
 Doubles:  (Jeoung Young-sik & Lee Sang-su) (m) /  (Chen Meng & Wang Manyu) (f)
 Mixed:  (Wong Chun Ting & Doo Hoi Kem)
 October 8–13: 2019 German Open in  Bremen
 Singles:  Fan Zhendong (m) /  SUN Yingsha (f)
 Doubles:  (Liang Jingkun & Xu Xin) (m) /  (Jeon Ji-hee & Yang Ha-eun) (f)
 Mixed:  (Xu Xin & SUN Yingsha)
 November 12–17: 2019 Austrian Open in  Linz

World Tour events
 January 15–20: 2019 Hungarian Open in  Budapest
 Singles:  Lin Gaoyuan (m) /  Chen Meng (f)
 Doubles:  (Liang Jingkun & Xu Xin) (m) /  (Wang Manyu & Zhu Yuling) (f)
 Mixed:  (Xu Xin & Liu Shiwen)
 June 4–9: 2019 Hong Kong Open in 
 Singles:  Lin Gaoyuan (m) /  WANG Yidi (f)
 Doubles:  (Liang Jingkun & Lin Gaoyuan) (m) /  (CHEN Ke & Mu Zi) (f)
 Mixed:  (LIN Yun-ju & Cheng I-ching)
 July 2–7: 2019 Korea Open in  Busan
 Singles:  Xu Xin (m) /  Chen Meng (f)
 Doubles:  (Fan Zhendong & Xu Xin) (m) /  (Chen Meng & Wang Manyu) (f)
 Mixed:  (Wong Chun Ting & Doo Hoi Kem)
 August 13–18: 2019 Bulgarian Open in  Panagyurishte
 Singles:  Tomokazu Harimoto (m) /  Chen Xingtong (f)
 Doubles:  (Jeoung Young-sik & Lee Sang-su) (m) /  (Gu Yuting & Mu Zi) (f)
 Mixed:  (Jun Mizutani & Mima Ito)
 August 20–25: 2019 Czech Open in  Olomouc
 Singles:  LIN Yun-ju (m) /  Chen Xingtong (f)
 Doubles:  (CHO Dae-seong & Lee Sang-su) (m) /  (Gu Yuting & Mu Zi) (f)
 Mixed:  (CHO Dae-seong & SHIN Yu-bin)
 October 1–6: 2019 Swedish Open in  Stockholm
 Singles:  Wang Chuqin (m) /  Chen Meng (f)
 Doubles:  (Fan Zhendong & Xu Xin) (m) /  (Chen Meng & Ding Ning) (f)
 Mixed:  (Xu Xin & Liu Shiwen)

Grand Finals
 December 12–15: 2019 ITTF World Tour Grand Finals in  Zhengzhou

2019 ITTF Challenge Series
Plus events
 February 13–17: Portugal Open in  Lisbon
 Singles:  Liang Jingkun (m) /  Hina Hayata (f)
 Doubles:  (CAO Wei & XU Yingbin) (m) /  (FAN Siqi & YANG Huijing) (f)
 Mixed doubles:  (Lin Gaoyuan & Liu Shiwen)
 March 20–24: Oman Open in  Muscat
 Singles:  LIN Yun-Ju (m) /  Hina Hayata (f)
 Doubles:  (LIAO Cheng-Ting & LIN Yun-Ju) (m) /  (Satsuki Odo & Saki Shibata) (f)
 Mixed doubles:  (LIN Yun-Ju & Cheng I-ching)
 July 24–28: Pyongyang Open in 
 Singles:  AN Ji-song (m) /  Kim Song-i (f)
 Doubles:  (HAM Yu-song & RI Kwang-myong) (m) /  (CHA Hyo-sim & KIM Nam-hae) (f)
 Mixed doubles:  (HAM Yu-song & CHA Hyo-sim)
 August 7–11: Nigeria Open in  Lagos
 Singles:  Quadri Aruna (m) /  Polina Mikhaylova (f)
 Doubles:  Cedric Nuytinck &  Quentin Robinot (m) /  (Polina Mikhaylova & Yana Noskova) (f)
 Mixed doubles:  (Kilian Ort & WAN Yuan)
 September 10–14: Paraguay Open in  Asunción
 Singles:  Masataka Morizono (m) /  Hina Hayata (f)
 Doubles:  Masataka Morizono &  Ľubomír Pištej (m) /  (Honoka Hashimoto & Maki Shiomi) (f)
 Mixed doubles:  (Brian Afanador & Adriana Díaz)
 December 4–8: Canada Open in  Markham

Regular events
 March 20–24: Spanish Open in  Guadalajara
 Singles:  ZHAI Yujia (m) /  Miyu Kato (f)
 Doubles:  (Kilian Ort & QIU Dang) (m) /  (Stephanie Loeuillette & YUAN Jianan) (f)
 May 1–5: Serbia Open in  Belgrade
 Singles:  Paul Drinkhall (m) /  Hina Hayata (f)
 Doubles:  (Diogo Carvalho & João Geraldo) (m) /  (NG Wing Nam & Minnie Wai Yam SOO) (f)
 May 8–12: Slovenia Open in  Otočec
 Singles:  Wei Shihao (m) /  Georgina Póta (f)
 Doubles:  (Eric Jouti & Gustavo Tsuboi) (m) /  (Miyuu Kihara & Miyu Nagasaki) (f)
 May 14–18: Croatia Open in  Zagreb
 Singles:  Anton Kallberg (m) /  Miyuu Kihara (f)
 Doubles:  (Shunsuke Togami & Yukiya Uda) (m) /  (Miyuu Kihara & Miyu Nagasaki) (f)
 May 22–26: Thailand Open in  Bangkok
 Singles:  Ruwen Filus (m) /  Hitomi Sato (f)
 Doubles:  (Ruwen Filus & Steffen Mengel) (m) /  (Satsuki Odo & Saki Shibata) (f)
 October 16–20: Mexico Open in  Cancún
 Event cancelled.
 October 16–20: Polish Open in  Władysławowo
 Singles:  XU Yingbin (m) /  HE Zhuojia (f)
 Doubles:  (Gaston Alto & Horacio Cifuentes) (m) /  (Honoka Hashimoto & Maki Shiomi) (f)
 October 30 – November 3: Belarus Open in  Minsk
 Singles:  Emmanuel Lebesson (m) /  Hina Hayata (f)
 Doubles:  (Xu Haidong & ZHAO Zhaoyan) (m) /  (Satsuki Odo & Saki Shibata) (f)
 October 30 – November 3: Morocco Open in  Agadir
 Event cancelled.
 November 13–17: Indonesia Open in  Batam
 November 19–23: Turkish Open in  Antalya
 Event cancelled.

2019 ITTF World Junior Circuit
Golden Series events
 May 15–19: Thailand Junior and cadet Open in  Bangkok
 Junior Singles:  Yanapong Panagitgun (m) /  KUAI Man (f)
 Cadet Singles:  Louis Laffineur (m) /  KUAI Man (f)
 June 12–16: China Junior and cadet Open in  Taicang
 Junior Singles:  QUAN Kaiyuan (m) /  YUAN Yuan (f)
 Cadet Singles:  CHEN Yaxuan (m) /  CHEN Yi (f)
 August 7–11: Hong Kong Junior and cadet Open in 

 Junior boys' singles:  Amin Ahmadian
 Junior girls' singles:  Haruna Ojio
 Junior boys' doubles:  Amin Ahmadian &  Yanapong Panagitgun
 Junior girls' doubles:  (CHIEN Tung-Chuan & YU Hsiu-Ting)

 Cadet boys' singles:  Sora Matsushima
 Cadet girls' singles:  KIM Na-yeong
 Cadet boys' doubles:  (CHUANG Chia-Chuan & KAO Cheng-Jui)
 Cadet girls' doubles:  (Miwa Harimoto & Haruna Ojio)

 September 18–22: Croatian Junior and cadet Open in  Varaždin

 Junior boys' singles:  NIU Guankai
 Junior girls' singles:  KUAI Man
 Junior boys' doubles:  (CAO Yantao & LIANG Guodong)
 Junior girls' doubles:  (WU Yangchen & ZANG Xiaotong)

 Cadet boys' singles:  CHEN Yuanyu
 Cadet girls' singles:  CHEN Yi
 Cadet boys' doubles:  (LIN Shidong & ZHANG Minghao)
 Cadet girls' doubles:  (CHEN Yi & LENG Yutong)

Premium events
 February 7–11: Bahrain Junior and cadet Open in  Manama

 Junior boys' singles:  Lev Katsman
 Junior girls' singles:  Kristina Kazantseva
 Junior boys' doubles:  (Lev Katsman & Artem Tikhonov)
 Junior girls' doubles:  (Kristina Kazantseva & Olga Vishniakova)

 Cadet boys' singles:  Payas Jain
 Cadet girls' singles:  Anargya Manjunath

 February 13–17: Czech Junior and cadet Open in  Hodonín

 Junior boys' singles:  Samuel Kulczycki
 Junior girls' singles:  Honami Nakamori
 Junior boys' doubles:  (Josh Shao Han CHUA & Yew En Koen PANG)
 Junior girls' doubles:  (Camille Lutz & Prithika Pavade)

 Cadet boys' singles:  Denis Izumrudov
 Cadet girls' singles:  Kaho AKAE
 Cadet boys' doubles:  (Milhane Jellouli & Alexis Kouraichi)
 Cadet girls' doubles:  (Miwa Harimoto & Yura Shinohara)

 March 20–24: Italy Junior and cadet Open in  Lignano

 Junior boys' singles:  XIANG Peng
 Junior girls' singles:  CHEN Yi
 Junior boys' doubles:  (GAO Yang & ZENG Beixun)
 Junior girls' doubles:  (CHEN Yi & WU Yangchen)

 Cadet boys' singles:  LIN Shidong
 Cadet girls' singles:  CHEN Yi
 Cadet boys' doubles:  (CHEN Yuanyu & HUANG Youzheng)
 Cadet girls' doubles:  (CHEN Yi & KUAI Man)

 April 10–14: French Junior and cadet Open in  Metz

 Junior boys' singles:  Lev Katsman
 Junior girls' singles:  Prithika Pavade
 Junior boys' doubles:  (Maksim Grebnev & Lev Katsman)
 Junior girls' doubles:  (Amy Wang & Crystal Wang)

 Cadet boys' singles:  Hayate Suzuki
 Cadet girls' singles:  Sakura Yokoi
 Cadet boys' doubles:  Simon Belik &  Mike Hollo
 Cadet girls' doubles:  (Kaho Akae & Sakura Yokoi)

 April 15–19: Belgium Junior and cadet Open in  Spa

 Junior boys' singles:  QUAN Kaiyuan
 Junior girls' singles:  ZANG Xiaotong
 Junior boys' doubles:  (Hiroto Shinozuka & Jo Yokotani)
 Junior girls' doubles:  (LENG Yutong & LIANG Jiayi)

 Cadet boys' singles:  CHEN Yuanyu
 Cadet girls' singles:  XU Yi
 Cadet boys' doubles:  (CHEN Yuanyu & LIN Shidong)
 Cadet girls' doubles:  (LIU Ru-Yun & TSAI Yun-En)

 May 22–26: Polish Junior and cadet Open in  Władysławowo

 Junior boys' singles:  Vincent Picard
 Junior girls' singles:  Sakura Yokoi
 Junior boys' doubles:  (Lilian Bardet & Vincent Picard)
 Junior girls' doubles:  Zdena Blaskova &  Franziska Schreiner

 Cadet boys' singles:  Darius Movileanu
 Cadet girls' singles:  Sakura Yokoi
 Cadet boys' doubles:  (Andrei Teodor Istrate & Horia Stefan Ursut)
 Cadet girls' doubles:  (Ami Shirayama & Sakura Yokoi)

 September 25–29: Chinese Taipei Junior and cadet Open in  Taipei

 Junior boys' singles:  TAI Ming-Wei
 Junior girls' singles:  Kaho Akae
 Junior boys' doubles:  (Yu Kayama & Ryoichi Yoshiyama)
 Junior girls' doubles:  (CHIEN Tung-Chuan & YU Hsiu-Ting)

 Cadet boys' singles:  KAO Cheng-Jui
 Cadet girls' singles:  Kaho Akae
 Cadet boys' doubles:  (WU Chiou-Shin & ZHANG Huan-Qi)
 Cadet girls' doubles:  (Kaho Akae & Hina Higashikawa)

 October 24–28: Oman Junior and cadet Open in  Muscat

 Junior boys' singles:  TAI Ming-Wei
 Junior girls' singles:  CAI Fong-En

 Cadet boys' singles:  CHEN Yen-Ting
 Cadet girls' singles:  CHENG Pu-Syuan

 November 6–10: Hungarian Junior and cadet Open in  Szombathely

 Junior boys' singles:  QUAN Kaiyuan
 Junior girls' singles:  WANG Tianyi
 Junior boys' doubles:  (LIANG Guodong & QUAN Kaiyuan)
 Junior girls' doubles:  (CHIEN Tung-Chuan & YU Hsiu-Ting)

 Cadet boys' singles:  TAO Yuchang
 Cadet girls' singles:  LENG Yutong
 Cadet boys' doubles:  (TAO Yuchang & ZHANG Minghao)
 Cadet girls' doubles:  (LENG Yutong & QIN Yuxuan)

Regular events
 February 20–24: Swedish Junior and cadet Open in  Örebro

 Junior boys' singles:  Truls Moregard
 Junior girls' singles:  Kaho Akae
 Junior boys' doubles:  (BEH Kun Ting & PANG Yew En Koen)
 Junior girls' doubles:  (Honami Nakamori & Yukari Sugasawa)

 Cadet boys' singles:  Haruki Harada
 Cadet girls' singles:  Kaho Akae

 March 20–24: Chile Junior and cadet Open in  Santiago

 Junior boys' singles:  Santiago Lorenzo
 Junior girls' singles:  Giulia Takahashi
 Junior boys' doubles:  (Nicolas Burgos & Andrés Martínez)
 Junior girls' doubles:  (Tamyres Fukase & Livia Lima)

 Cadet boys' singles:  Carlos Fernandez
 Cadet girls' singles:  Laura Watanabe
 Cadet boys' doubles:  (Henrique Noguti & Joon Shim)
 Cadet girls' doubles:  (Giulia Takahashi & Laura Watanabe)

 April 1–5: Ghana Junior and cadet Open in  Accra

 Junior boys' singles:  Azeez Solanke
 Junior girls' singles:  Diya Parag Chitale
 Junior boys' doubles:  (Jamiu Ayanwale & Azeez Solanke)
 Junior girls' doubles:  Diya Parag Chitale &  Nandeshwaree Jalim

 Cadet boys' singles:  Taiwo Mati
 Cadet girls' singles:  Ananya Chande
 Cadet boys' doubles:  (Jamiu Ayanwale & Taiwo Mati)
 Cadet girls' doubles:  Ruby Chan &  Ananya Chande

 April 28 – May 1: Australian Junior and cadet Open in  Darwin

 Junior boys' singles:  HUANG Yu-Jen
 Junior girls' singles:  YU Hsiu-Ting

 Cadet boys' singles:  YIU Kwan To
 Cadet girls' singles:  Phoebe Wai HUI

 May 1–5: Spanish Junior and cadet Open in  Castell-Platja d'Aro

 Junior boys' singles:  Vladislav Ursu
 Junior girls' singles:  Olga Vishniakova
 Junior boys' doubles:  Guilherme Teodoro &  Vladislav Ursu
 Junior girls' doubles:  (Elizabet Abraamian & Ekaterina Zironova)

 Cadet boys' singles:  Alexis Kouraichi
 Cadet girls' singles:  Vlada Voronina
 Cadet boys' doubles:  (Hugo Deschamps & Felix Lebrun)
 Cadet girls' doubles:  (Vlada Voronina & Alina Zavarykina)

 June 12–16: Morocco Junior and cadet Open in  Agadir

 Junior boys' singles:  Vincent Picard
 Junior girls' singles:  Ema Labosova
 Junior boys' doubles:  (Filip Delincak & Adam Klajber)
 Junior girls' doubles:  (Ema Cincurova & Laura Vinczeova)

 Cadet boys' singles:  Taiwo Mati
 Cadet girls' singles:  Melissa Belache
 Cadet boys' doubles:  Balazs Lei &  Taiwo Mati
 Cadet girls' doubles:  (Eliska Stullerova & Dominika Wiltschkova)

 August 14–18: El Salvador Junior and cadet Open in  San Salvador

 Junior boys' singles:  Jayden Zhou
 Junior girls' singles:  Lucia Cordero
 Junior boys' doubles:  (Sid Naresh & Jayden Zhou)
 Junior girls' doubles:  (Lucia Cordero & Hidalynn Zapata)

 Cadet boys' singles:  Jayden Zhou
 Cadet girls' singles:  Nicole Deng
 Cadet boys' doubles:  Rogelio Castro &  Diego de la Cruz
 Cadet girls' doubles:  (Victoria Guevara & Cristina Machado)

 September 24–28: Serbia Junior and cadet Open in  Zrenjanin

 Junior boys' singles:  Guilherme Teodoro
 Junior girls' singles:  Elizabet Abraamian
 Junior boys' doubles:  (Guilherme Teodoro & Eduardo Tomoike)
 Junior girls' doubles:  (Elizabet Abraamian & Liubov Tentser)

 Cadet boys' singles:  Napat Thanmathikom
 Cadet girls' singles:  Sarvinoz Mirkadirova
 Cadet boys' doubles:  (Daniel Moldovan & Paul Szilagyi)
 Cadet girls' doubles:  (Mia Griesel & Jele Stortz)

 October 2–6: Slovenia Junior and cadet Open in  Otočec

 Junior boys' singles:  Adam Klajber
 Junior girls' singles:  POON Yat
 Junior boys' doubles:  Ivor Ban &  Nicolas Degros
 Junior girls' doubles:  (Reka Bezeg & Radmila Tominjak)

 Cadet boys' singles:  Andrei Teodor Istrate
 Cadet girls' singles:  Anna Brzyska
 Cadet boys' doubles:  (Balazs Lei & David Szantosi)
 Cadet girls' doubles:  (Giulia Takahashi & Laura Watanabe)

 October 8–12: North Macedonia Junior and cadet Open in  Skopje

 Junior boys' singles:  Andrei Teodor Istrate
 Junior girls' singles:  Radmila Tominjak
 Junior boys' doubles:  (Ivor Ban & Lovro Zovko)
 Junior girls' doubles:  (Reka Bezeg & Radmila Tominjak)

 Cadet boys' singles:  Paul Szilagyi
 Cadet girls' singles:  Bianca Mei Rosu
 Cadet boys' doubles:  (Andrei Teodor Istrate & Paul Szilagyi)
 Cadet girls' doubles:  (Bianca Mei Rosu & Evelyn Ungvari)

 October 16–20: Egypt Junior and cadet Open in  Sharm El Sheikh

 Junior boys' singles:  Marwan Abdelwahab
 Junior girls' singles:  TSAI Yu-Chin
 Junior boys' doubles:  (Marwan Abdelwahab & Ahmed Elborhamy)
 Junior girls' doubles:  (CHANG Ying-Ying & TSAI Yu-Chin)

 Cadet boys' singles:  Khalid Alshareif
 Cadet girls' singles:  Hana Goda
 Cadet boys' doubles:  (Daniel Kostal & Matyas Lebeda)
 Cadet girls' doubles:  Melissa Belache &  Hana Goda

 October 30 – November 3: Slovak Junior and cadet Open in  Nitra

 Junior boys' singles:  Seu Goto
 Junior girls' singles:  Charlotte Bardsley
 Junior boys' doubles:  Seu Goto &  Kai Zarehbin
 Junior girls' doubles:  (Ema Cincurova & Dominika Wiltschkova)

 Cadet boys' singles:  Navid Shams
 Cadet girls' singles:  Charlotte Lutz
 Cadet boys' doubles:  (Flavien Coton & Nathan Lam)
 Cadet girls' doubles:  (Clea de Stoppeleire & Charlotte Lutz)

 November 13–17:  Portugal Junior and cadet Open in  Guimarães

Current ITTF World Ranking

See also
 International Table Tennis Federation
 2019 in sports

References

External links
 International Table Tennis Federation
 European Table Tennis Union
 Asian Table Tennis Union

 
Table tennis by year
2019 sport-related lists